Charlotte Atkinson (1796–1867) was the author of Australia's earliest known children's book. The book titled A Mother's Offering to her Children: By a Lady, Long Resident in New South Wales. Sydney: Gazette Office was published in 1841.

Anonymously published, the book was originally attributed to Lady J.J. Gordon Bremer, the wife of Sir James John Gordon Bremer.  However, extensive research by Marcie Muir supports its attribution to Charlotte Barton.

Early life
Charlotte Waring was born in 1796 and christened on 13 March 1796 at St Mary's, Marylebone, London. Her parents were Albert Waring and his wife Elizabeth Turner.

Arrival, and life, in Australia 
In 1826 Charlotte Waring came to New South Wales to take up a position as governess to the family of Hannibal Hawkins Macarthur. She became engaged during the voyage to James Atkinson, a highly respected agriculturalist and author of the first substantial book on Australian farming. They married in 1827. The couple settled at Atkinson's property Oldbury in the Southern Highlands of New South Wales. They had four children, including the author and naturalist Caroline Louisa Waring Calvert (née Atkinson).  The children appear, slightly disguised, as the four children of the book. Charlotte's father, Thomas Albert Waring, died in 1829. She is mentioned in his will as the wife of James Atkinson in NSW.

James Atkinson died in 1834, and Charlotte married Oldbury's overseer George Bruce Barton in March 1836. He became insane and Charlotte was forced to separate from him. Barton had a history of alcoholism and violence, and was eventually convicted of manslaughter in Bathurst in 1854.

Charlotte left Oldbury with her children bound for Budgong and later moved to Sydney.  Her guardianship of her children was resoundingly confirmed as of 6 July 1841 in a decision by C.J. Dowling of the Supreme Court of New South Wales.

It being made manifest, therefore, that Mrs. Barton is herself competent to educate her children either by herself or by any competent assistance under her own eye, it would require a state of urgent circumstances to induce the Court to deprive them (all of whom are under thirteen years of age) of that maternal care and tenderness, which none but a mother can bestow.

After winning legal custody of her children, Charlotte returned to Oldbury, where she died in 1867.

A Mother's Offering 
A Mother's Offering, which predates subsequent Australian literature for the young by a decade, is written in the genre of children's conversation textbooks, a dialogue between mother and children, reflecting the importance of family conversation to education in the home in the nineteenth century, and follows the pattern of literature by Jean-Jacques Rousseau in its expository question-and-answer format concluding in pious moralising. It is not a dull tract however; Charlotte drew on her own experiences in the colony, and probably on actual conversations with her children, in preparing a stimulating, often exciting text that presents children with local adventures and Australian heroes for the first time. It is an excellent example of the influence women had on the community through the education of their children, though the children's questions and reactions are gendered; Clara being interested in botany and Julius in hunting.

The book covers a variety of topics, from natural history, often as an example for human morality, to geology, shipwrecks and the customs of the Australian Aborigines. Some parts are quite lurid, such as her description of the wreck of the Charles Eaton, a ship that went down in the Torres Strait in 1834. It was claimed that many children survived the shipwreck only to be eaten by cannibals.  She describes Aboriginal 'monsters' and their 'wanton barbarities' in her A Mother's Offering account of shipwrecked Eliza Fraser's treatment, which she explains is a result of Islanders and aborigines being more prone to 'unrestrained passions' than the British. Life's dangers were a frequent theme of 19th-century Australian children's fiction. And yet there is scientific understanding evident in her accounting for explosions heard in the bush 'as loud as cannon' with reference to theories of Sir John Herschel.

The book was published by George William Evans (1780–1852), a surveyor who had arrived in Port Jackson in 1802. He led the expedition which crossed the Great Dividing Range in 1813. He returned to England in 1826 but came back to Australia in 1832 and set up as a bookseller and stationer.

As a collector's item 
The book is very rare and it commands high prices; in April 2005 a copy fetched $48,000. In July 2011 another auctioned by Treloars sold for $25,000 and on 12 June 2011 her "workbook", a 30-page book of illustrations with pen, ink & watercolour drawings that was created as a gift to her daughter Jane Emily on her thirteenth birthday in 1843, sold at auction for $70,000 to a private bidder. . Aalders auction catalogue included the following biography:

Atkinson family 
Most of the work of the talented Atkinson family is in the State Library of NSW, where many pages are dignified not by one hand, but "Atkinson family". Here though we can see a direct source for the known work, dated, personal, and full of the quiet and tender observation that conjured so much fully realised work that now makes up our understanding of a life in the new colony. A brilliant and dazzling jewel. Provenance: The Atkinson family.

References

External links 
 A Mother's Offering to Her Children – [Sydney? : s.n., 1841?] edition fully digitised from the collection of the National Library of Australia
 A Mother's Offering to Her Children – PDF eText of the book / University of Sydney Library, Scholarly Electronic Text and Image Service

1797 births
1867 deaths
Australian children's writers
Australian women children's writers
English emigrants to colonial Australia
19th-century Australian writers
19th-century Australian women writers